Miss Ukraine Universe 2017, the 22nd edition of the Miss Ukraine Universe pageant was held in Fairmont Grand Hotel in Kyiv. Alena Spodynyuk of Kyiv crowned her successor Yana Krasnikova of Kyiv at the end of the event. 16 contestants competed for the crown.

The winner represented Ukraine at Miss Universe 2017 pageant in Las Vegas.

Results

Placement

Special Awards

Contestants
The official Top 16 finalists of The Next Miss Ukraine Universe 2017.

Judges
 Anna Filimonova - Head of the Organizing Committee of Miss Ukraine Universe Pageant
 Kateryna Silchenko - designer, the owner of the popular Ukrainian brand The COAT by Katya Silchenko, the leading stylist of Ukraine
 Andriy Palchevsky - a successful businessman, philosopher, founder and head of the Eurolab medical center, TV presenter, president of the Charitable Foundation
 Andriy Pyatov - Honored Master of Sports, vice-captain and goalkeeper of the national football team of Ukraine, permanent goalkeeper of the football club of the club "Shakhtar"
 Dante Thomas - American singer
 Yuriy Cheban - Honored Master of Sports, two-time Olympic champion, two-time world champion in canoeing
 Ted Halbush - owner of the international cruise company Carnival Cruise Lines.

References

External links

2017
2017 beauty pageants
August 2017 events in Ukraine
2017 in Ukraine